Franz Oberacher (born 24 March 1954) is a former international Austrian footballer.

References

External links
 
 

1954 births
Living people
Austrian footballers
Austria international footballers
1978 FIFA World Cup players
FC Wacker Innsbruck players
1. FC Nürnberg players
Bundesliga players
2. Bundesliga players
AZ Alkmaar players
Association football forwards
People from Innsbruck-Land District
Footballers from Tyrol (state)
Austrian expatriate sportspeople in West Germany
Austrian expatriate sportspeople in the Netherlands
Austrian expatriate footballers
Expatriate footballers in West Germany
Expatriate footballers in the Netherlands
FC Kärnten players